Chaclacayo is a district of the Lima Province in Peru. Together with Chosica, Chaclacayo is the natural exit district to Central Peru, east of Lima, through the Carretera Central (Central Highway).

Location
Chaclacayo is located at an elevation of 647 m and at the 27th km mark of the Carretera Central, the main road headed East starting in the Lima urban center.
Borders:
North: Rimac River and Lurigancho (Chosica)
South: Cieneguilla
West: Ate
East: Lurigancho (Chosica)

History 
During the colonial era (17th-18th centuries), the corregimiento De la Buena Muerte executed its functions from Chaclacayo. It was then that began the formation of the nine estates that, with the passing of time, would originate the district.

Geography
Chaclacayo is located in the valley of the Rímac River that runs from the Peruvian Andes to the Pacific Ocean. Its weather is typical of the Coastal Andes: During summertime (from December to February) it is warm and sometimes rainy; the rest of the year it is usually sunny, with average temperatures between 14 and 20 °C. The coldest months are June and July, when temperatures can drop to 12 °C.

Name
The name is derived from an Aymara word that means "at the foot of the carrizo". Carrizo is a plant that grows by the Rimac's riverside.

Main attractions
Places to visit in Chaclacayo are the Parque Central, the central park of the district. Around the park there are other landmarks: a well-known bakery, an Evangelical church, a bazaar, La Oficina de Robin a popular bar, and the Chaclacayo District Council.

Neighborhoods
Urban Context
La Floresta
Alfonso Cobian
Vírgen de Fátima de Morón
Huascata
Miguel Grau
Villa Rica
Santa Rosa
Villa Mercedes
Santa Ines
Los Cóndores
Morón
Ñaña
Huascata
La Tapada
3 de Octubre
Residential Clubs
El Cuadro 
Los Cóndores

Miscellaneous
The peculiar shape of the district has made some think of Huampaní and Ñaña as being part of Chaclacayo.  However those towns belong to the neighboring district of Lurigancho.

See also 
 Administrative divisions of Peru

References

External links

 News and Articles about Chaclacayo
 Municipalidad Distrital of Chaclacayo

Districts of Lima